Alexander Baring, 1st Baron Ashburton, PC (27 October 177412 May 1848), of The Grange in Hampshire, of Ashburton in Devon and of Buckenham Tofts near Thetford in Norfolk, was a British politician and financier, and a member of the Baring family. Baring was the second son of Sir Francis Baring, 1st Baronet, and of Harriet, daughter of William Herring.

Early life
Alexander was born on 27 October 1774.  He was the second son born to Harriet Herring (1750–1804) and Sir Francis Baring, 1st Baronet (1740–1810).  Among his siblings was Maria (the mother of Francis Stainforth), Sir Thomas Baring, 2nd Baronet, Henry Baring (a Member of Parliament for Bossiney and Colchester), and George Baring (who founded the Hong Kong trading house of Dent & Co.). His father, alongside his uncle, John Baring, established the London merchant house of John and Francis Baring Company, which eventually became Barings Bank.

His paternal grandparents were Elizabeth Vowler and Johann Baring, a wool merchant who emigrated to England in 1717 from Germany and established the family in England. His maternal grandfather was merchant William Herring of Croydon and among his mother's family was her cousin, Thomas Herring, Archbishop of Canterbury.

Career
Alexander was brought up in his father's business, and became a partner at Hope & Co. He was sent to the United States for various land deals, and formed wide connections with wealthy American families. In 1807 Alexander became a partner in the family firm, along with his brothers Thomas and Henry, and the name was changed to Baring Brothers & Co. When Henry Hope died in 1811, the London offices of Hope & Co. merged with Baring Brothers & Co.

Political career
Baring sat in parliament for Taunton between 1806 and 1826, for Callington between 1826 and 1831, for Thetford between 1831 and 1832 and North Essex between 1832 and 1835. He regarded politics from the point of view of the business man and opposed the orders-in-council for "the restrictions on trade with the United States in 1812," and, in 1826, the act for the suppression of small banknotes as well as other reform. He accepted the post Chancellor of the Exchequer in the Duke of Wellington's projected ministry of 1832; but afterwards, alarmed at the men in parliament, declared "he would face a thousand devils rather than such a House of Commons." After the Panic of 1847, Baring headed an external bimetallist movement hoping to prevent the undue restriction of the currency.

Baring was Master of the Mint in Robert Peel's government and, on Peel's retirement in 1835, was raised to the peerage as Baron Ashburton, of Ashburton, in the County of Devon, a title previously held by John Dunning, 1st Baron Ashburton. In 1842 he was again sent to America, and the same year concluded the Webster–Ashburton Treaty. A compromise was settled concerning the north-east boundary of Maine, the extradition of certain criminals was arranged, each state agreed to maintain a squadron of at least eighty guns on the coast of Africa for the suppression of the slave trade, and the two governments agreed to unite in an effort to persuade other powers to close all slave markets within their territories. Despite his earlier attitude, Lord Ashburton disapproved of Peel's free trade and opposed the Bank Charter Act of 1844.

Ashburton was a trustee of the British Museum and of the National Gallery, a privy councillor and D.C.L. He published, besides several speeches, An Enquiry into the Causes and Consequences of ... Orders in Council (1808), and The Financial and Commercial Crisis Considered (1847).

Slave holder
Baring was the recipient of compensation when slavery was abolished in the 1830s. He received compensation for nearly 500 slaves across four estates. He was compensated at Spring Garden in British Guiana to the tune of over £3,400. He was also compensated to the tune of more than £6,500 on three estates in St Kitts.

Personal life
On 23 August 1798, Ashburton married Ann Louisa Bingham (1782–1848), daughter of Ann Willing Bingham and William Bingham of Philadelphia, who served as a U.S. Senator and was one of the richest men in America, having made his fortune during the American Revolution through trading and ownership of privateers. Her maternal grandfather was Thomas Willing, the president of the First Bank of the United States. Together, they had nine children:

 Bingham Baring, 2nd Baron Ashburton (1799–1864), who married Lady Harriet Mary Montagu, eldest daughter of George Montagu, 6th Earl of Sandwich.
 Francis Baring, 3rd Baron Ashburton (1800–1868), who married Hortense Maret (–1882), daughter of Hughes-Bernard Maret, 1st Duke of Bassano, Prime Minister of France.
 Harriet Baring (1804–1892), married Henry Thynne, 3rd Marquess of Bath.
 Frederick Baring (1806–1868), Rector of Itchen Stoke, married Frederica Ashton on 24 April 1831.
 Anne Eugenia Baring (died 1839), married Humphrey St John-Mildmay.
 Alexander Baring (1810–1832), who died on board HMS Alfred in the Mediterranean.
 Arthur Baring (1818–1838), who died unmarried.
 Louisa Emily Baring (died 1888)
 Lydia Emily Baring (died 1868)

Ashburton died on 12 May 1848 at Longleat, in Wiltshire. His widow died several months later on 5 December 1848.

Descendants
Through his eldest son, he was a grandfather of Mary Florence Baring (1860–1902), who married William Compton, 5th Marquess of Northampton. Through his second son, he was a grandfather of Alexander Baring, 4th Baron Ashburton (1835–1889), and Maria Anne Louisa Baring (1833–1928), who married William FitzRoy, 6th Duke of Grafton.

Quotes
Of this great mercantile family the Duke of Richelieu wittily remarked; "There are six main powers in Europe; Britain, France, Austria-Hungary, Russia, Prussia and Baring-Brothers!" (Vicary Gibbs, from the "Complete Peerage" 1910).

References

Attribution:

External links 
 

|-

1774 births
1848 deaths
British people of German descent
Baring, Alexander
English bankers
Members of the Privy Council of the United Kingdom
Masters of the Mint
History of banking
Baring, Alexander
Baring, Alexander
Baring, Alexander
Baring, Alexander
Baring, Alexander
Baring, Alexander
Baring, Alexander
Baring, Alexander
Baring, Alexander
UK MPs who were granted peerages
Baring, Alexander
Baring, Alexander
Alexander
Presidents of the Board of Trade
Alexander 1
Peers of the United Kingdom created by William IV
British slave owners
Recipients of payments from the Slavery Abolition Act 1833